Amyl may refer to:

 Amylum or starch, a carbohydrate
 Amylopectin, a polymer of glucose found in plants; one of two components of starch
 Amylose, a helical polymer made of α-D-glucose units; one of two components of starch
 Pentyl, a five-carbon alkyl functional group, also known by the common non-systematic name amyl
 Amyl nitrite, used to treat heart diseases and cyanide poisoning (known as Amyl when used as a recreational drug)
Dinitrogen tetroxide, an oxidizer used in rocket fuel

See also
 Amylamine, a solvent and raw material
 Amylase, an enzyme that catalyses the hydrolysis of starch into sugars
 Amyloid, fibrous protein aggregates, originally named in the mistaken belief that they contained starch
 Amyloplast, non-pigmented organelles found in some plant cells
 Amyl acetate, used as a flavoring agent, solvent, and in the preparation of penicillin
 Amyl alcohol, a solvent
 Amyl nitrate, organic reagent and diesel fuel additive
 Amylmetacresol, an antiseptic for mouth and throat infections
 Amyl and the Sniffers, an Australian band